Wayne Black and Kevin Ullyett were the defending champions but did not compete that year.

James Blake and Mark Merklein won in the final 6–2, 6–4 against Julian Knowle and Nenad Zimonjić.

Seeds

  Jared Palmer /  Pavel Vízner (semifinals)
  Julian Knowle /  Nenad Zimonjić (final)
  Mariusz Fyrstenberg /  Marcin Matkowski (first round)
  Petr Pála /  Radek Štěpánek (first round)

Draw

References
 2004 BMW Open Doubles Draw

2004 ATP Tour
2004 BMW Open